Hamadryas velutina, the velutina cracker, is a butterfly of the family Nymphalidae. It is found in the Amazon basin.

The wingspan is about 36 mm.

References

Hamadryas (butterfly)
Butterflies described in 1865
Nymphalidae of South America
Taxa named by Henry Walter Bates